Minories was the western terminus of the London and Blackwall Railway (L&BR), located on the east side of Minories, a short distance north-east of the Tower of London.

It opened on 6 July 1840, as the City of London terminus for the L&BR (then known as the Commercial Railway). The following year, it was supplemented by a new station several hundred yards to its west, named Fenchurch Street, designed by William Tite. However, Minories station continued in use as an alternative terminus; it was closed temporarily between 15 February 1849 and 9 September 1849, before finally closing for good on 24 October 1853.

The station site was later converted into goods sidings, and the lower levels of the old station were converted into the Mint Street Goods Depot. The depot remained open until April 1951; demolition came shortly afterward. The location of the station and winching houses are marked by the Minories public house. The western terminus of the Docklands Light Railway opened at Tower Gateway, just to the south of the site of Minories station, in August 1987.

References

External links
 

Disused railway stations in the City of London
Railway stations in Great Britain opened in 1840
Railway stations in Great Britain closed in 1853
Former London and Blackwall Railway stations